Torch cactus is a common name for several plants and may refer to:

Silver torch cactus (Cleistocactus strausii)
Peruvian torch cactus (Echinopsis peruviana)